Haplodrassus hiemalis is a species of ground spider in the family Gnaphosidae. It is found in North America and a range from Russia (European to Far East).

References

Gnaphosidae
Articles created by Qbugbot
Spiders described in 1909